Colin Carr-Lawton (born 5 September 1978) is an English former professional footballer who played as a striker. He played five matches in the Football League for Burnley, making his début in the 1–4 defeat to Grimsby Town on 22 November 1997.

References

External links

1978 births
Living people
English footballers
Association football forwards
Burnley F.C. players
Berwick Rangers F.C. players
Whitby Town F.C. players
Ethnikos Asteras F.C. players
English Football League players
Scottish Football League players